The 1921–22 season saw Rochdale compete in the newly formed Football League Third Division North, where they finished in 20th and last position with 26 points.

Statistics

|-
|}

Final league table

Competitions

Football League Third Division North

Results by matchday

FA Cup

Lancashire Senior Cup

Manchester Cup

References

Rochdale A.F.C. seasons
Rochdale